The 2018 United States House of Representatives elections in Kentucky were held on November 6, 2018, to elect the six U.S. representatives from the state of Kentucky, one from each of the state's six congressional districts. The elections coincided with other elections to the House of Representatives, elections to the United States Senate, and various state and local elections.

Overview

By district
Results of the 2018 United States House of Representatives elections in Kentucky by district:

District 1

The incumbent is Republican James Comer, who has represented the district since 2016. Comer elected with 73% of the vote in 2016.

Democratic primary

 Alonzo Pennington, musician
 Paul Walker, professor

Primary results

Republican primary
James Comer, incumbent

General election

Results

District 2

The incumbent is Republican Brett Guthrie, who has represented the district since 2009. Guthrie was re-elected unopposed in 2016.

Democratic primary

 Hank Linderman, musician
 Brian Pedigo
 Rane Eir Olivia Sessions
 Grant Short

Primary results

Republican primary
 Brett Guthrie, incumbent

General election

Results

District 3

The incumbent is Democrat John Yarmuth, who has represented the district since 2007. Yarmuth was re-elected with 63% of the vote in 2016.

Democratic primary
 John Yarmuth, incumbent

Republican primary
 Mike Craven
 Vickie Yates Glisson, lawyer
 Rhonda Palazzo, realtor

Primary results

General election

Results

District 4

The incumbent is Republican Thomas Massie, who has represented the district since 2012. Massie was re-elected with 71% of the vote in 2016.

Democratic primary
 Seth Hall
 Christina Lord
 Patti Piatt, business executive

Primary results

Republican primary
 Thomas Massie, incumbent

General election

Results

District 5

The incumbent is Republican Hal Rogers, who has represented the district since 1981. Rogers was re-elected unopposed in 2016.

Democratic primary
 Kenneth Stepp, attorney
 Scott Sykes

Primary results

Republican primary
 Hal Rogers, incumbent
 Gerardo Serrano

Primary results

General election

Results

District 6

Republican Andy Barr, who has represented the district since 2013, was re-elected to a third term with 61% of the vote in 2016.

The Democratic Congressional Campaign Committee included Kentucky's 6th congressional district on its initial list of Republican-held seats considered targets in 2018.

Democratic primary
 Jim Gray, mayor of Lexington
 Theodore Green
 Daniel Kemph, business analyst
 Amy McGrath, retired U.S. Marine
 Reggie Thomas, state senator
 Geoff Young

Primary results

Republican primary
 Andy Barr, incumbent
 Chuck Eddy

Primary results

General election

Endorsements

Polling
Graphical summary

Results

See also 
 2018 Kentucky House of Representatives election

References

External links
Candidates at Vote Smart
Candidates at Ballotpedia
Campaign finance at FEC
Campaign finance at OpenSecrets
 

Official campaign websites of first district candidates
Paul Walker (D) for Congress
James Comer (R) for Congress

Official campaign websites of second district candidates
Hank Linderman (D) for Congress
Brett Guthrie (R) for Congress

Official campaign websites of third district candidates
John Yarmuth (D) for Congress
Vickie Yates Glisson (R) for Congress

Official campaign websites of fourth district candidates
Seth Hall (D) for Congress
Thomas Massie (R) for Congress
David Goodwin (I) for Congress

Official campaign websites of fifth district candidates
Hal Rogers (R) for Congress
Kenneth Stepp (D) for Congress

Official campaign websites of sixth district candidates
Andy Barr (R) for Congress
Amy McGrath (D) for Congress
 Frank Harris (L) for Congress

Kentucky
2018
United States House